Eli Davies (birth unknown – death unknown) was a Welsh professional rugby league footballer who played in the 1900s.

International honours
Eli Davies won a cap playing  for Other Nationalities in the 9-3 victory over England at Central Park, Wigan on Tuesday 5 April 1904, in the first ever international rugby league match.

References

External links
Statistics at wigan.rlfans.com
Memento of a Great Dai in Wigan

Other Nationalities rugby league team players
Place of birth missing
Place of death missing
Rugby league five-eighths
Welsh rugby league players
Wigan Warriors players
Year of birth missing
Year of death missing